Euchalcia consona is a moth of the family Noctuidae. It is found in Europe from Austria, through Hungary and Siberia up to the Ural mountains.

The wingspan is 30–36 mm. The moth flies from May to June and again from August to September in two generations depending on the location.

The larvae feed on Nonea pulla, Anchusa arvensis and Pulmonaria species.

External links
www.lepiforum.de
euchalcia
www.schmetterlinge-deutschlands.de
Fauna Europaea

Plusiinae
Moths of Europe